Carlos Urrutia is Peru's ambassador to Venezuela. Peru twice recalled Urrutia as a protest against Venezuela's alleged interference in the 2006 Peruvian national election by supporting Ollanta Humala.

References

Peruvian diplomats
Urrutia
Ambassadors of Peru to Venezuela
Living people
Year of birth missing (living people)